The Dominican Republic is a country located on the island of Hispaniola in the Greater Antilles archipelago of the Caribbean region. It occupies the eastern five-eighths of the island, which it shares with Haiti, making Hispaniola one of only two Caribbean islands, along with Saint Martin, that is shared by two sovereign states. The official language of the country is Spanish.

The native Taíno people had inhabited Hispaniola before the arrival of Europeans, dividing it into five chiefdoms. They had constructed an advanced farming and hunting society, and were in the process of becoming an organized civilization. The Taínos also inhabited Cuba, Jamaica, Puerto Rico, and the Bahamas. The Genoese mariner Christopher Columbus explored and claimed the island for Castile, landing there on his first voyage in 1492. The colony of Santo Domingo became the site of the first permanent European settlement in the Americas and the first seat of Spanish colonial rule in the New World. It would also become the site to introduce importations of enslaved Africans to the Americas. In 1697, Spain recognized French dominion over the western third of the island, which became the independent state of Haiti in 1804.

After more than three hundred years of Spanish rule, the Dominican people declared independence in November 1821. The leader of the independence movement, José Núñez de Cáceres, intended the Dominican nation to unite with the country of Gran Colombia, but the newly independent Dominicans were forcefully annexed by Haiti in February 1822. Independence came 22 years later in 1844, after victory in the Dominican War of Independence. Over the next 72 years, the Dominican Republic experienced mostly civil wars (financed with loans from European merchants), several failed invasions by its neighbour, Haiti, and brief return to Spanish colonial status, before permanently ousting the Spanish during the Dominican War of Restoration of 1863–1865. During this period, three presidents were assassinated (José Antonio Salcedo in 1864, Ulises Heureaux in 1899, and Ramón Cáceres in 1911).

The U.S. occupied the Dominican Republic (1916–1924) due to threats of defaulting on foreign debts; a subsequent calm and prosperous six-year period under Horacio Vásquez followed. From 1930 the dictatorship of Rafael Leónidas Trujillo ruled until his assassination in 1961. Juan Bosch was elected president in 1962 but was deposed in a military coup in 1963. A civil war in 1965, the country's last, was ended by U.S. military intervention and was followed by the authoritarian rule of Joaquín Balaguer (1966–1978 and 1986–1996). Since 1978, the Dominican Republic has moved toward representative democracy, and has been led by Leonel Fernández for most of the time after 1996. Danilo Medina succeeded Fernández in 2012, winning 51% of the electoral vote over his opponent ex-president Hipólito Mejía. He was later succeeded by Luis Abinader in the 2020 presidential election after anti-government protests erupted that year.

The Dominican Republic has the largest economy (according to the U.S. State Department and the World Bank) in the Caribbean and Central American region and is the seventh-largest economy in Latin America. Over the last 25 years, the Dominican Republic has had the fastest-growing economy in the Western Hemisphere – with an average real GDP growth rate of 5.3% between 1992 and 2018. GDP growth in 2014 and 2015 reached 7.3 and 7.0%, respectively, the highest in the Western Hemisphere. In the first half of 2016, the Dominican economy grew 7.4% continuing its trend of rapid economic growth. Recent growth has been driven by construction, manufacturing, tourism, and mining. The country is the site of the third largest gold mine in the world, the Pueblo Viejo mine. Private consumption has been strong, as a result of low inflation (under 1% on average in 2015), job creation, and a high level of remittances. Income inequality, for generations an unsolved issue, has faded thanks to its rapid economic growth and now the Dominican Republic exhibits a Gini coefficient of 39, similar to that of Israel and Uruguay, and better than countries like the United States, Costa Rica or Chile. Illegal immigration from Haiti has resulted in government action. Immigration from Haiti has increased tensions between Dominicans and Haitians. The Dominican Republic is also home to 114,050 illegal immigrants from Venezuela. According to the UN, the country struggles with systemic racism and discrimination based on race, mostly targeted towards people of Haitian origin. 

The Dominican Republic is the most visited destination in the Caribbean. The year-round golf courses and resorts are major attractions. A geographically diverse nation, the Dominican Republic is home to both the Caribbean's tallest mountain peak, Pico Duarte, and the Caribbean's largest lake and lowest point, Lake Enriquillo. The country is also the site of the first cathedral, castle, monastery, and fortress built in the Americas, located in Santo Domingo's Colonial Zone, a World Heritage Site. The Dominican Republic is highly vulnerable to natural disasters.

Etymology 

The name Dominican originates from Santo Domingo de Guzmán (Saint Dominic), the patron saint of astronomers, and founder of the Dominican Order.

The Dominican Order established a house of high studies on the colony of Santo Domingo that is now known as the Universidad Autónoma de Santo Domingo, the first University in the New World. They dedicated themselves to the education of the inhabitants of the island, and to the protection of the native Taíno people who were subjected to slavery.

For most of its history, up until independence, the colony was known simply as  – the name of its present capital and patron saint, Saint Dominic – and continued to be commonly known as such in English until the early 20th century.  The residents were called "Dominicans", the adjectival form of "Domingo", and as such, the revolutionaries named their newly independent country the "Dominican Republic".

In the national anthem of the Dominican Republic, the term "Dominicans" does not appear. The author of its lyrics, Emilio Prud'Homme, consistently uses the poetic term "Quisqueyans". The word "Quisqueya" derives from the Taíno language, and means "mother of the lands". It is often used in songs as another name for the country. The name of the country in English is often shortened to "the D.R.", but this is rare in Spanish.

History

Pre-European history 

The Arawakan-speaking Taíno moved into Hispaniola from the north east region of what is now known as South America, displacing earlier inhabitants, c. 650 C.E. They engaged in farming, fishing, hunting and gathering. The fierce Caribs drove the Taíno to the northeastern Caribbean, during much of the 15th century. The estimates of Hispaniola's population in 1492 vary widely, including tens of thousands, one hundred thousand, three hundred thousand, and four hundred thousand to two million. Determining precisely how many people lived on the island in pre-Columbian times is next to impossible, as no accurate records exist. By 1492, the island was divided into five Taíno chiefdoms. The Taíno name for the entire island was either Ayiti or Quisqueya.

The Spaniards arrived in 1492. Initially, after friendly relationships, the Taínos resisted the conquest, led by the female Chief Anacaona of Xaragua and her ex-husband Chief Caonabo of Maguana, as well as Chiefs Guacanagaríx, Guamá, Hatuey, and Enriquillo. The latter's successes gained his people an autonomous enclave for a time on the island. Within a few years after 1492, the population of Taínos had declined drastically, due to smallpox, measles, and other diseases that arrived with the Europeans.

The first recorded smallpox outbreak, in the Americas, occurred on Hispaniola in 1507. The last record of pure Taínos in the country was from 1864. Still, Taíno biological heritage survived to an important extent, due to intermixing. Census records from 1514 reveal that 40% of Spanish men in Santo Domingo were married to Taíno women, and some present-day Dominicans have Taíno ancestry. Remnants of the Taíno culture include their cave paintings, such as the Pomier Caves, as well as pottery designs, which are still used in the small artisan village of Higüerito, Moca.

European colonization 

Christopher Columbus arrived on the island on December 5, 1492, during the first of his four voyages to the Americas. He claimed the land for Spain and named it La Española, due to its diverse climate and terrain, which reminded him of the Spanish landscape. In 1496, Bartholomew Columbus, Christopher's brother, built the city of Santo Domingo, Western Europe's first permanent settlement in the "New World". The Spaniards created a plantation economy on the island. The colony was the springboard for the further Spanish conquest of America and for decades the headquarters of Spanish power in the hemisphere.

The Taínos nearly disappeared, above all, due to European infectious diseases. Other causes were abuse, suicide, the breakup of family, starvation, the encomienda system, which resembled a feudal system in Medieval Europe, war with the Spaniards, changes in lifestyle, and mixing with other peoples. Laws passed for the native peoples' protection (beginning with the Laws of Burgos, 1512–1513) were never truly enforced. African slaves were imported to replace the dwindling Taínos.

On December 25, 1521, enslaved Africans of Senegalese Wolof origin led the first major slave revolt of the Americas on the plantation of Diego Colón, son of Christopher Columbus. They fought the Spanish colonists for a year, until the rebellion was brutally crushed in December 1522. After this, laws were passed in order to enforce harsh punishments on those who planned to stage another uprising. But despite this, slave revolts continued to transpire as many of the slaves successfully escaped. This also resulted in the establishment of the first Maroon communities of the Americas, and many Maroon leaders emerged from these revolts. Leaders such as Sebastian Lemba, a Maroon born in Africa who successfully rebelled in 1532, became the most prolific leader of this era. His actions would inspire other leaders such as Juan Vaquero, Diego del Guzmán, Fernando Montoro, Juan Criollo and Diego del Campo, to lead successful revolts of their own. Maroons would continue to place Spanish control in jeopardy, as many parts of the island fell under Maroon control. Although many of the leaders would eventually be captured and executed by the Admiral, Maroon activities would continue to be present in the island well into the 17th century.

After its conquest of the Aztecs and Incas, Spain neglected its Caribbean holdings. Hispaniola's sugar plantation economy quickly declined. Most Spanish colonists left for the silver-mines of Mexico and Peru, while new immigrants from Spain bypassed the island. Agriculture dwindled, enslaved people were no longer transported to the island, and white colonists, free Black people, and enslaved Black people alike lived in poverty. The breakdown of racial and class-based social hierarchies facilitated an increase in cross-cultural contact, resulting in a population of predominantly mixed Spanish, Taíno, and African descent. Except for the city of Santo Domingo, which managed to maintain some legal exports, Dominican ports were forced to rely on contraband trade, which, along with livestock, became one of the main sources of livelihood for the island's inhabitants.

In the mid-17th century, France sent colonists to settle the island of Tortuga and the northwestern coast of Hispaniola (which the Spaniards had abandoned by 1606) due to its strategic position in the region. In order to entice the pirates, France supplied them with women who had been taken from prisons, accused of prostitution and thieving. After decades of armed struggles with the French settlers, Spain ceded the western coast of the island to France with the 1697 Treaty of Ryswick, whilst the Central Plateau remained under Spanish domain. France created a wealthy colony on the island, while the Spanish colony continued to suffer economic decline.

On April 17, 1655, English forces landed on Hispaniola, and marched 30 miles overland to Santo Domingo, the main Spanish stronghold on the island, where they laid siege to it. Spanish lancers attacked the English forces, sending them careening back toward the beach in confusion. The English commander hid behind a tree where, in the words of one of his soldiers, he was "so much possessed with terror that he could hardly speak". The Spanish defenders who had secured victory were rewarded with titles from the Spanish Crown.

18th century 

The House of Bourbon replaced the House of Habsburg in Spain in 1700, and introduced economic reforms that gradually began to revive trade in Santo Domingo. The crown progressively relaxed the rigid controls and restrictions on commerce between Spain and the colonies and among the colonies. The last flotas sailed in 1737; the monopoly port system was abolished shortly thereafter. By the middle of the century, the population was bolstered by emigration from the Canary Islands, resettling the northern part of the colony and planting tobacco in the Cibao Valley, and importation of slaves was renewed.

Santo Domingo's exports soared and the island's agricultural productivity rose, which was assisted by the involvement of Spain in the Seven Years' War, allowing privateers operating out of Santo Domingo to once again patrol surrounding waters for enemy merchantmen. Dominican privateers in the service of the Spanish Crown had already been active in the War of Jenkins' Ear just two decades prior, and they sharply reduced the amount of enemy trade operating in West Indian waters. The prizes they took were carried back to Santo Domingo, where their cargoes were sold to the colony's inhabitants or to foreign merchants doing business there. The enslaved population of the colony also rose dramatically, as numerous captive Africans were taken from enemy slave ships in West Indian waters.

Between 1720 and 1774, Dominican privateers cruised the waters from Santo Domingo to the coast of Tierra Firme, taking British, French, and Dutch ships with cargoes of African slaves and other commodities.

The colony of Santo Domingo saw a population increase during the 18th century, as it rose to about 91,272 in 1750. Of this number, approximately 38,272 were white landowners, 38,000 were free multiracial people of color, and some 15,000 were enslaved people. This contrasted sharply with the population of the French colony of Saint-Domingue (present-day Haiti) – the wealthiest colony in the Caribbean and whose population of one-half a million was 90% enslaved and overall, seven times as numerous as the Spanish colony of Santo Domingo. These Spanish colonists, the majority of whom were multiracial descendants of Spaniards, Taínos, Africans, and Canary Guanches, proclaimed: 'It does not matter if the French are richer than us, we are still the true inheritors of this island. In our veins runs the blood of the heroic conquistadores who won this island of ours with sword and blood.' As restrictions on colonial trade were relaxed, the colonial elites of Saint-Domingue offered the principal market for Santo Domingo's exports of beef, hides, mahogany, and tobacco. With the outbreak of the Haitian Revolution in 1791, the rich urban families linked to the colonial bureaucracy fled the island, while most of the rural hateros (cattle ranchers) remained, even though they lost their principal market.

Inspired by disputes between white people and mulatto people in Saint-Domingue, a slave revolt broke out in the French colony. Although the population of Santo Domingo was perhaps one-fourth that of Saint-Domingue, this did not prevent the King of Spain from launching an invasion of the French side of the island in 1793, attempting to seize all, or part, of the western third of the island in an alliance of convenience with the formerly enslaved rebels. In August 1793, a column of Dominican troops advanced into Saint-Domingue and were joined by Haitian rebels. However, these rebels soon turned against Spain and instead joined France. The Dominicans were not defeated militarily, but their advance was restrained, and when in 1795 Spain ceded Santo Domingo to France by the Treaty of Basel, Dominican attacks on Saint-Domingue ceased.

French occupation
Between 1795–1802, the French colonists would endure and suppress several slave revolts in Santo Domingo such as the back to back revolts of Hincha and Samaná in the spring of 1795, the large-scale Nigua rebellion in 1796, and the Gambia revolt of 1802. After declaring independence in 1804, Jean-Jacques Dessalines, attempted to take control of the eastern side of the island in 1805, laying siege to the city until being forced to retreat in light of news of a possible invasion by a French naval squadron believed to be heading towards Haiti, and during his retreat, subjecting the Dominicans to a massacre. The French retained Santo Domingo until 1809, when combined Spanish and Dominican forces, aided by the British, defeated the French, leading to a recolonization by Spain.

Ephemeral independence 

After a dozen years of discontent and failed independence plots by various opposing groups, including a failed 1812 revolt led by Dominican conspirators José Leocadio, Pedro de Seda, and Pedro Henríquez, Santo Domingo's former Lieutenant-Governor (top administrator), José Núñez de Cáceres, declared the colony's independence from the Spanish crown as Spanish Haiti, on November 30, 1821. This period is also known as the Ephemeral independence.

Haitian occupation of Santo Domingo (1822–44) 

The newly independent republic ended two months later under the Haitian government led by Jean-Pierre Boyer.

As Toussaint Louverture had done two decades earlier, the Haitians abolished slavery. In order to raise funds for the huge indemnity of 150 million francs that Haiti agreed to pay the former French colonists, and which was subsequently lowered to 60 million francs, the Haitian government imposed heavy taxes on the Dominicans. Since Haiti was unable to adequately provision its army, the occupying forces largely survived by commandeering or confiscating food and supplies at gunpoint. Attempts to redistribute land conflicted with the system of communal land tenure (terrenos comuneros), which had arisen with the ranching economy, and some people resented being forced to grow cash crops under Boyer and Joseph Balthazar Inginac's Code Rural. In the rural and rugged mountainous areas, the Haitian administration was usually too inefficient to enforce its own laws. It was in the city of Santo Domingo that the effects of the occupation were most acutely felt, and it was there that the movement for independence originated.

The Haitians associated the Roman Catholic Church with the French slave-masters who had exploited them before independence and confiscated all church property, deported all foreign clergy, and severed the ties of the remaining clergy to the Vatican. All levels of education collapsed; the university was shut down, as it was starved both of resources and students, with young Dominican men from 16 to 25 years old being drafted into the Haitian army. Boyer's occupation troops, who were largely Dominicans, were unpaid and had to "forage and sack" from Dominican civilians. Haiti imposed a "heavy tribute" on the Dominican people.

Haiti's constitution forbade white elites from owning land, and Dominican major landowning families were forcibly deprived of their properties. During this time, many white elites in Santo Domingo did not consider owning slaves due to the economic crisis that Santo Domingo faced during the España Boba period. The few landowners that wanted slavery established in Santo Domingo had to emigrate to Cuba, Puerto Rico, or Gran Colombia. Many landowning families stayed on the island, with a heavy concentration of landowners settling in the Cibao region. After independence, and eventually being under Spanish rule once again in 1861, many families returned to Santo Domingo including new waves of immigration from Spain.

Dominican War of Independence (1844–56) 

In 1838, Juan Pablo Duarte founded a secret society called La Trinitaria, which sought the complete independence of Santo Domingo without any foreign intervention. Also Francisco del Rosario Sánchez and Ramon Matias Mella, despite not being among the founding members of La Trinitaria, were decisive in the fight for independence. Duarte, Mella, and Sánchez are considered the three Founding Fathers of the Dominican Republic.

In 1843, the new Haitian president, Charles Rivière-Hérard, exiled or imprisoned the leading Trinitarios (Trinitarians). After subduing the Dominicans, Rivière-Hérard, a mulatto, faced a rebellion by blacks in Port-au-Prince. Haiti had formed two regiments composed of Dominicans from the city of Santo Domingo; these were used by Rivière-Hérard to suppress the uprising.

On February 27, 1844, the surviving members of La Trinitaria, now led by Tomás Bobadilla, declared the independence from Haiti. The Trinitarios were backed by Pedro Santana, a wealthy cattle rancher from El Seibo, who became general of the army of the nascent republic. The Dominican Republic's first Constitution was adopted on November 6, 1844, and was modeled after the United States Constitution. The decades that followed were filled with tyranny, factionalism, economic difficulties, rapid changes of government, and exile for political opponents. Archrivals Santana and Buenaventura Báez held power most of the time, both ruling arbitrarily. They promoted competing plans to annex the new nation to another power: Santana favored Spain, and Báez the United States.

Threatening the nation's independence were renewed Haitian invasions. In March 1844, Rivière-Hérard attempted to reimpose his authority, but the Dominicans put up stiff opposition and inflicted heavy casualties on the Haitians.

The Battle of Azua was the first major battle of the Dominican War of Independence and was fought on March 19. The Dominicans opened the battle with a cannon barrage followed by rifle discharges and machete charges. When the Haitian commander, Vicent Jean Degales, was beheaded by the Dominicans, his troops retreated in disarray. The outnumbered Dominican forces suffered only five casualties in the battle while the Haitians sustained over 1,000 killed. The Battle of Santiago was the second major battle of the war and was fought on March 30. The Haitians charged the Dominicans under grapeshot and musketry fire and were repulsed. At sea, the Dominicans defeated the Haitians at the Battle of Tortuguero off the coast of Azua on April 15, temporarily expelling Haitian forces.

In early July 1844, Duarte was urged by his followers to take the title of President of the Republic. Duarte agreed, but only if free elections were arranged. However, Santana's forces took Santo Domingo on July 12, and they declared Santana ruler of the Dominican Republic. Santana then put Mella, Duarte, and Sánchez in jail. On February 27, 1845, Santana executed María Trinidad Sánchez, heroine of La Trinitaria, and others for conspiracy.

On June 17, 1845, small Dominican detachments invaded Haiti, capturing Lascahobas and Hinche. The Dominicans established an outpost at Cachimán, but the arrival of Haitian reinforcements soon compelled them to retreat back across the frontier. Haiti launched a new invasion on August 6. A member of La Trinitaria, José María Serra, claimed that over 3,000 Haitian soldiers and less than 20 Dominican militias had been killed at this point. On September 17, the Dominicans defeated the Haitian vanguard near the frontier at the Battle of Estrelleta, where the Dominican infantry square repulsed a Haitian cavalry charge with bayonets. The Dominicans suffered no deaths during the battle and only three wounded. On November 27, the Dominicans defeated the Haitian army at the Battle of Beler. Haitian losses were 350 killed, while the Dominicans suffered 16 killed. Among the dead  were three Haitian generals, including the army's commander, Seraphin. The Dominicans repelled the Haitian forces, on both land and sea, by December 1845.

The Haitians invaded again in 1849, forcing the president of the Dominican Republic, Manuel Jimenes, to call upon Santana, whom he had ousted as president, to lead the Dominicans against this new invasion. Santana met the enemy at Ocoa, April 21, with only 400 militiamen, and succeeded in defeating the 18,000-strong Haitian army. The battle began with heavy cannon fire by the entrenched Haitians and ended with a Dominican assault followed by hand-to-hand combat. Three Haitian generals were killed. In November 1849, Dominican seamen raided the Haitian coasts, plundered seaside villages, as far as Dame Marie, and butchered crews of captured enemy ships.

By 1854, both countries were at war again. In November, a Dominican squadron composed of the brigantine 27 de Febrero and schooner Constitución captured a Haitian warship and bombarded Anse-à-Pitres and Saltrou. In November 1855, Haiti invaded again. Over 1,000 Haitians (including two generals) were killed in the battles of Santomé and Cambronal in December 1855. The Haitians suffered 1,500 killed at Sabana Larga and Jácuba in January 1856, and in an engagement at Ouanaminthe, over 1,000 Haitian troops were killed and many were wounded and missing.

Battles of the Dominican War of Independence

Key: (D)  – Dominican Victory; (H)  – Haitian Victory

1844
 March 18 – Battle of Cabeza de Las Marías (H) 
 March 19 – Battle of Azua (D) 
 March 30 – Battle of Santiago (D) 
 April 13 – Battle of El Memiso (D) 
 April 15 – Battle of Tortuguero (D) 
 December 6 – Battle of Fort Cachimán (D) 
1845
 September 17 – Battle of Estrelleta (D) 
 November 27 – Battle of Beler (D) 
1849
 April 19 – Battle of El Número (D) 
 April 21 – Battle of Las Carreras (D) 
1855
 December 22 – Battle of Santomé (D) 
 December 22 – Battle of Cambronal (D) 
1856
 January 24 – Battle of Sabana Larga (D)

First Republic 

The Dominican Republic's first constitution was adopted on November 6, 1844. The state was commonly known as Santo Domingo in English until the early 20th century.  It featured a presidential form of government with many liberal tendencies, but it was marred by Article 210, imposed by Pedro Santana on the constitutional assembly by force, giving him the privileges of a dictatorship until the war of independence was over. These privileges not only served him to win the war but also allowed him to persecute, execute and drive into exile his political opponents, among which Duarte was the most important.

The constant threat of renewed Haitian invasion required all men of fighting age to take up arms in defense against the Haitian military. Theoretically, fighting age was generally defined as between 15 and 18 years of age to 40 or 50 years. Despite wide, popular glorification of military service, many in the ranks of the Liberation Army were mutinous and desertion rates were high despite penalties as severe as death for shirking the obligation of military service.

The population of the Dominican Republic in 1845 was approximately 230,000 people (100,000 whites; 40,000 blacks; and 90,000 mulattoes). Due to the rugged mountainous terrain of the island the regions of the Dominican Republic developed in isolation from one another. In the south, also known at the time as Ozama, the economy was dominated by cattle-ranching (particularly in the southeastern savannah) and cutting mahogany and other hardwoods for export. This region retained a semi-feudal character, with little commercial agriculture, the hacienda as the dominant social unit, and the majority of the population living at a subsistence level. In the north (better-known as Cibao), the nation's richest farmland, farmers supplemented their subsistence crops by growing tobacco for export, mainly to Germany. Tobacco required less land than cattle ranching and was mainly grown by smallholders, who relied on itinerant traders to transport their crops to Puerto Plata and Monte Cristi. Santana antagonized the Cibao farmers, enriching himself and his supporters at their expense by resorting to multiple peso printings that allowed him to buy their crops for a fraction of their value. In 1848, he was forced to resign and was succeeded by his vice-president, Manuel Jimenes.

After defeating a new Haitian invasion in 1849, Santana marched on Santo Domingo and deposed Jimenes in a coup d'état. At his behest, Congress elected Buenaventura Báez as president, but Báez was unwilling to serve as Santana's puppet, challenging his role as the country's acknowledged military leader. In 1853, Santana was elected president for his second term, forcing Báez into exile. Three years later, he negotiated a treaty leasing a portion of Samaná Peninsula to a U.S. company; popular opposition forced him to abdicate, enabling Báez to return and seize power. With the treasury depleted, Báez printed eighteen million uninsured pesos, purchasing the 1857 tobacco crop with this currency and exporting it for hard cash at immense profit to himself and his followers. Cibao tobacco planters, who were ruined when hyperinflation ensued, revolted and formed a new government headed by José Desiderio Valverde and headquartered in Santiago de los Caballeros. In July 1857, General Juan Luis Franco Bidó besieged Santo Domingo. The Cibao-based government declared an amnesty to exiles and Santana returned and managed to replace Franco Bidó in September 1857. After a year of civil war, Santana captured Santo Domingo in June 1858, overthrew both Báez and Valverde and installed himself as president.

Restoration republic 

In 1861, after imprisoning, silencing, exiling, and executing many of his opponents and due to political and economic reasons, Santana asked Queen Isabella II of Spain to retake control of the Dominican Republic, after a period of only 17 years of independence. Spain, which had not come to terms with the loss of its American colonies 40 years earlier, accepted his proposal and made the country a colony again. Haiti, fearful of the reestablishment of Spain as colonial power, gave refuge and logistics to revolutionaries seeking to reestablish the independent nation of the Dominican Republic. The ensuing civil war, known as the War of Restoration, claimed more than 50,000 lives.

The War of Restoration began in Santiago on August 16, 1863. Spain had a difficult time fighting the Dominican guerrillas. Over the course of the war, the Spanish would spend over 33 million pesos and suffer 30,000 casualties, including 10,888 killed or wounded in action. In the south, Dominican forces under José María Cabral defeated the Spanish in the Battle of La Canela on December 4, 1864. The victory showed the Dominicans that they could defeat the Spaniards in pitched battle. After two years of fighting, Spain abandoned the island in 1865. Political strife again prevailed in the following years; warlords ruled, military revolts were extremely common, and the nation amassed debt.

After the Ten Years' War (1868–78) broke out in Spanish Cuba, Dominican exiles, including Máximo Gómez, Luis Marcano and Modesto Díaz, joined the Cuban Revolutionary Army and provided its initial training and leadership.

In 1869, U.S. President Ulysses S. Grant ordered U.S. Marines to the island for the first time. Pirates operating from Haiti had been raiding U.S. commercial shipping in the Caribbean, and Grant directed the Marines to stop them at their source. Following the virtual takeover of the island, Báez offered to sell the country to the United States. Grant desired a naval base at Samaná and also a place for resettling newly freed African Americans. The treaty, which included U.S. payment of $1.5 million for Dominican debt repayment, was defeated in the United States Senate in 1870 on a vote of 28–28, two-thirds being required.

Báez was toppled in 1874, returned, and was toppled for good in 1878. A new generation was thence in charge, with the passing of Santana (he died in 1864) and Báez from the scene. Relative peace came to the country in the 1880s, which saw the coming to power of General Ulises Heureaux. "Lilís", as the new president was nicknamed, enjoyed a period of popularity. He was, however, "a consummate dissembler", who put the nation deep into debt while using much of the proceeds for his personal use and to maintain his police state. Heureaux became rampantly despotic and unpopular. In 1899, he was assassinated. However, the relative calm over which he presided allowed improvement in the Dominican economy. The sugar industry was modernized, and the country attracted foreign workers and immigrants.

Lebanese, Syrians, Turks, and Palestinians began to arrive in the country during the latter part of the 19th century. At first, the Arab immigrants often faced discrimination in the Dominican Republic, but they were eventually assimilated into Dominican society, giving up their own culture and language. During the U.S. occupation of 1916–24, peasants from the countryside, called Gavilleros, would not only kill U.S. Marines, but would also attack and kill Arab vendors traveling through the countryside.

20th century (1900–30) 

From 1902 on, short-lived governments were again the norm, with their power usurped by caudillos in parts of the country. Furthermore, the national government was bankrupt and, unable to pay its debts to European creditors, faced the threat of military intervention by France, Germany, and Italy. United States President Theodore Roosevelt sought to prevent European intervention, largely to protect the routes to the future Panama Canal, as the canal was already under construction. He made a small military intervention to ward off European powers, to proclaim his famous Roosevelt Corollary to the Monroe Doctrine, and also to obtain his 1905 Dominican agreement for U.S. administration of Dominican customs, which was the chief source of income for the Dominican government. A 1906 agreement provided for the arrangement to last 50 years. The United States agreed to use part of the customs proceeds to reduce the immense foreign debt of the Dominican Republic and assumed responsibility for said debt.

After six years in power, President Ramón Cáceres (who had himself assassinated Heureaux) was assassinated in 1911. The result was several years of great political instability and civil war. U.S. mediation by the William Howard Taft and Woodrow Wilson administrations achieved only a short respite each time. A political deadlock in 1914 was broken after an ultimatum by Wilson telling the Dominicans to choose a president or see the U.S. impose one. A provisional president was chosen, and later the same year relatively free elections put former president (1899–1902) Juan Isidro Jimenes Pereyra back in power. To achieve a more broadly supported government, Jimenes named opposition individuals to his cabinet. But this brought no peace and, with his former Secretary of War Desiderio Arias maneuvering to depose him and despite a U.S. offer of military aid against Arias, Jimenes resigned on May 7, 1916.

Wilson thus ordered the U.S. occupation of the Dominican Republic. U.S. Marines landed on May 16, 1916, and had control of the country two months later. The military government established by the U.S., led by Vice Admiral Harry Shepard Knapp, was widely repudiated by the Dominicans, with caudillos in the mountainous eastern regions leading guerrilla campaigns against U.S. forces. Arias's forces, who had no machine guns or modern artillery, tried to take on the U.S. Marines in conventional battles, but were defeated at the Battle of Las Trencheras (the trenches), Battle of Guayacanas and the Battle of San Francisco de Macoris.

The occupation regime kept most Dominican laws and institutions and largely pacified the general population. The occupying government also revived the Dominican economy, reduced the nation's debt, built a road network that at last interconnected all regions of the country, and created a professional National Guard to replace the warring partisan units. Additionally, with grass-roots support from local communities and assistance from both Dominican and US officials, the Dominican education system expanded significantly during US occupation. Between 1918 and 1920, more than three hundred schools were established nationwide. Opposition to the occupation continued, nevertheless, and after World War I it increased in the U.S. as well. There, President Warren G. Harding (1921–23), Wilson's successor, worked to put an end to the occupation, as he had promised to do during his campaign. The U.S. government's rule ended in October 1922, and elections were held in March 1924.

The victor was former president (1902–03) Horacio Vásquez, who had cooperated with the U.S. He was inaugurated on July 13, 1924, and the last U.S. forces left in September. In six years, the Marines were involved in at least 370 engagements, with 950 "bandits" killed or wounded in action to the Marines' 144 killed. Vásquez gave the country six years of stable governance, in which political and civil rights were respected and the economy grew strongly, in a relatively peaceful atmosphere.

During the government of Horacio Vásquez, Rafael Trujillo held the rank of lieutenant colonel and was chief of police. This position helped him launch his plans to overthrow the government of Vásquez. Trujillo had the support of Carlos Rosario Peña, who formed the Civic Movement, which had as its main objective to overthrow the government of Vásquez.

In February 1930, when Vásquez attempted to win another term, his opponents rebelled in secret alliance with the commander of the National Army (the former National Guard), General Rafael Trujillo. Trujillo secretly cut a deal with rebel leader Rafael Estrella Ureña; in return for letting Ureña take power, Trujillo would be allowed to run for president in new elections. As the rebels marched toward Santo Domingo, Vásquez ordered Trujillo to suppress them. However, feigning "neutrality", Trujillo kept his men in barracks, allowing Ureña's rebels to take the capital virtually uncontested. On March 3, Ureña was proclaimed acting president with Trujillo confirmed as head of the police and the army. As per their agreement, Trujillo became the presidential nominee of the newly formed Patriotic Coalition of Citizens (Spanish: Coalición patriotica de los ciudadanos), with Ureña as his running mate.

During the election campaign, Trujillo used the army to unleash his repression, forcing his opponents to withdraw from the race. Trujillo stood to elect himself, and in May he was elected president virtually unopposed after a violent campaign against his opponents, ascending to power on August 16, 1930. Desiderio Arias led a failed revolt against Trujillo and was killed near Mao on June 20, 1931.

Trujillo Era (1930–61) 

There was considerable economic growth during Rafael Trujillo's long and iron-fisted regime, although a great deal of the wealth was taken by the dictator and other regime elements. There was progress in healthcare, education, and transportation, with the building of hospitals, clinics, schools, roads, and harbors. Trujillo also carried out an important housing construction program, and instituted a pension plan. He finally negotiated an undisputed border with Haiti in 1935, and achieved the end of the 50-year customs agreement in 1941, instead of 1956. He made the country debt-free in 1947. This was accompanied by absolute repression and the copious use of murder, torture, and terrorist methods against the opposition. It has been estimated that Trujillo's tyrannical rule was responsible for the death of more than 50,000 Dominicans.

Trujillo's henchmen did not hesitate to use intimidation, torture, or assassination of political foes both at home and abroad. Trujillo was responsible for the deaths of the Spaniards José Almoina in Mexico City and Jesús Galíndez in New York City.

In 1930, Hurricane San Zenon destroyed Santo Domingo and killed 8,000 people. During the rebuilding process, Trujillo renamed Santo Domingo to "Ciudad Trujillo" (Trujillo City), and the nation's – and the Caribbean's – highest mountain La Pelona Grande (Spanish for: The Great Bald) to "Pico Trujillo" (Spanish for: Trujillo Peak). By the end of his first term in 1934 he was the country's wealthiest person, and one of the wealthiest in the world by the early 1950s; near the end of his regime his fortune was an estimated $800 million ($5.3 billion today).

Trujillo, who neglected the fact that his maternal great-grandmother was from Haiti's mulatto class, actively promoted propaganda against Haitian people. In 1937, he ordered what became known as the Parsley Massacre or, in the Dominican Republic, as El Corte (The Cutting), directing the army to kill Haitians living on the Dominican side of the border. The army killed an estimated 17,000 to 35,000 Haitian men, women, and children over six days, from the night of October 2, 1937, through October 8, 1937. To avoid leaving evidence of the army's involvement, the soldiers used edged weapons rather than guns. The soldiers were said to have interrogated anyone with dark skin, using the shibboleth perejil (parsley) to distinguish Haitians from Afro-Dominicans when necessary; the 'r' of perejil was of difficult pronunciation for Haitians. As a result of the massacre, the Dominican Republic agreed to pay Haiti US$750,000, later reduced to US$525,000.

During World War II, Trujillo symbolically sided with the Allies and declared war on Japan the day after the attack on Pearl Harbor and on Nazi Germany and Italy four days later. Soon after, German U-boats torpedoed and sank two Dominican merchant vessels that Trujillo had named after himself—the San Rafael off Jamaica and the Presidente Trujillo off Fort-de-France, Martinique. German U-boats also sank four Dominican-manned ships in the Caribbean. The country did not make a military contribution to the war, but Dominican sugar and other agricultural products supported the Allied war effort. American Lend-Lease and raw material purchases proved a powerful inducement in obtaining cooperation of the various Latin American republics. Over a hundred Dominicans served in the American armed forces. Many were political exiles from the Trujillo regime.

Ramfis (the dictator's son) and Porfirio Rubirosa became a major part of the Rafael Trujillo regime's image in the foreign press, as a result of their jet setting lifestyle and relationships with Hollywood actresses.

Trujillo's dictatorship was marred by botched invasions, international scandals and assassination attempts. 1947 brought the failure of a planned invasion by leftist Dominican exiles from the Cuban island of Cayo Confites. July 1949 was the year of a failed invasion by Dominican rebels from Guatemala, and on June 14, 1959, there was a failed Cuban invasion at Constanza, Maimón and Estero Hondo. On June 26, 1959, Cuba broke diplomatic relations with the Dominican Republic due to widespread Dominican human rights abuses and hostility toward the Cuban people. Cuban leader Fidel Castro feared a possible attack from the Dominican Republic and was determined to acquire jet aircraft as a preventive measure. Cuba's ability to repel an air attack was very precarious, since the Dominicans possessed 40 jet aircraft whereas Cuba had only one. The Dominican Air Force had the theoretical ability to reach and bomb Havana within 3 hours.

On November 25, 1960, Trujillo's henchmen killed three of the four Mirabal sisters, nicknamed Las Mariposas (The Butterflies). The victims were Patria Mercedes Mirabal (born on February 27, 1924), Argentina Minerva Mirabal (born on March 12, 1926), and Antonia María Teresa Mirabal (born on October 15, 1935). Along with their husbands, the sisters were conspiring to overthrow Trujillo in a violent revolt. The Mirabals had communist ideological leanings, as did their husbands. The sisters have received many honors posthumously and have many memorials in various cities in the Dominican Republic. Salcedo, their home province, changed its name to Provincia Hermanas Mirabal (Mirabal Sisters Province). The International Day for the Elimination of Violence against Women is observed on the anniversary of their deaths.

For a long time, the U.S. and the Dominican elite supported the Trujillo government. This support persisted despite the assassinations of political opposition, the massacre of Haitians, and Trujillo's plots against other countries. The U.S. believed Trujillo was the lesser of two or more evils. The U.S. finally broke with Trujillo in 1960, after Trujillo's agents attempted to assassinate the Venezuelan president, Rómulo Betancourt, a fierce critic of Trujillo. Dominican agents placed a bomb in the Venezuelan president's car in Caracas, which exploded, injuring Betancourt and killing a number of his advisers.

In June 1960, Trujillo legalized the Communist Party and attempted to establish close political relations with the Soviet Bloc. Both the assassination attempt and the maneuver toward the Soviet Bloc provoked immediate condemnation throughout Latin America. Once its representatives confirmed Trujillo's complicity in the assassination attempt, the Organization of American States, for the first time in its history, decreed sanctions against a member state. The United States severed diplomatic relations with the Dominican Republic on August 26, 1960, and in January 1961 suspended the export of trucks, parts, crude oil, gasoline and other petroleum products. U.S. President Dwight D. Eisenhower also took advantage of OAS sanctions to cut drastically purchases of Dominican sugar, the country's major export. This action ultimately cost the Dominican Republic almost $22,000,000 in lost revenues at a time when its economy was in a rapid decline. Trujillo had become expendable. Dissidents inside the Dominican Republic argued that assassination was the only certain way to remove Trujillo.

According to Chester Bowles, the U.S. Undersecretary of State, internal Department of State discussions in 1961 on the topic were vigorous. Richard N. Goodwin, Assistant Special Counsel to the President, who had direct contacts with the rebel alliance, argued for intervention against Trujillo. Quoting Bowles directly: "The next morning I learned that in spite of the clear decision against having the dissident group request our assistance Dick Goodwin following the meeting sent a cable to CIA people in the Dominican Republic without checking with State or CIA; indeed, with the protest of the Department of State. The cable directed the CIA people in the Dominican Republic to get this request at any cost. When Allen Dulles found this out the next morning, he withdrew the order. We later discovered it had already been carried out."

Post-Trujillo (1961–1996) 

Trujillo was assassinated by Dominican dissidents on May 30, 1961. Although the dissidents possessed Dominican-made San Cristóbal submachine guns, they symbolically used U.S.-made M-1 carbines supplied by the United States Central Intelligence Agency (CIA).

Ramfis Trujillo, the dictator's son, remained in de facto control of the government for the next six months through his position as commander of the armed forces. Trujillo's brothers, Hector Bienvenido and Jose Arismendi Trujillo, returned to the country and began immediately to plot against President Balaguer. On November 18, 1961, as a planned coup became more evident, U.S. Secretary of State Dean Rusk issued a warning that the United States would not "remain idle" if the Trujillos attempted to "reassert dictatorial domination" over the Dominican Republic. Following this warning, and the arrival of a fourteen-vessel U.S. naval task force within sight of Santo Domingo, Ramfis and his uncles fled the country on November 19 with $200 million from the Dominican treasury. The OAS lifted its sanctions on January 4, 1962, since the Dominican Republic no longer posed a threat to regional security.

On December 28, 1962, the Dominican military suppressed a rebellion in Palma Sola, burning six hundred people to death by a napalm airstrike.

In February 1963, a democratically elected government under leftist Juan Bosch took office but it was overthrown in September. On April 24, 1965, after 19 months of military rule, a pro-Bosch revolt broke out in Santo Domingo. The pro-Bosch forces called themselves Constitutionalists. The revolution took on the dimensions of a civil war when conservative military forces struck back against the Constitutionalists on April 25. These conservative forces called themselves Loyalists. Despite tank assaults and bombing runs by Loyalist forces, the Constitutionalists held their positions in the capital. By April 26, armed civilians outnumbered the original rebel military regulars. Radio Santo Domingo, now fully under rebel control, began to call for more violent actions and for killing of all the policemen.

On April 28, U.S. President Lyndon Johnson, concerned that communists might take over the revolt and create a "second Cuba", sent 24,000 troops into Santo Domingo in Operation Powerpack. "We don't propose to sit here in a rocking chair with our hands folded and let the Communist set up any government in the Western Hemisphere," Johnson said. The forces were soon joined by comparatively small contingents from the Organization of American States (OAS). The 4th Marine Expeditionary Brigade and the army's 82nd Airborne Division spearheaded the occupation. Psychological Warfare and Green Beret units also took part in the action. The Loyalists used the U.S. presence to deploy its forces and attack Constitutionalists. As a result, Loyalist forces destroyed most Constitutionalist bases and captured the rebel radio station, effectively ending the war. A cease-fire was declared on May 21. The U.S. began withdrawing some of its troops by May 26. However, Col. Francisco Caamaño's untrained civilians attacked American positions on June 15. Despite the coordinated attack involving mortars, rocket launchers, and several light tanks, the rebels lost a 56-square-block area to 82nd Airborne Division units which had received OAS permission to advance.

Over 4,000 Dominicans were killed in action in the civil war, most of them prior to the U.S. intervention. A total of 44 American peacekeepers died and 283 were wounded. U.S. and OAS troops remained in the country for over a year and left after supervising elections in 1966 won by Joaquín Balaguer. He had been Trujillo's last puppet-president.
 
Balaguer remained in power as president for 12 years. His tenure was a period of repression of human rights and civil liberties, ostensibly to keep pro-Castro or pro-communist parties out of power; 11,000 persons were killed, tortured or forcibly disappeared. His rule was criticized for a growing disparity between rich and poor. It was, however, praised for an ambitious infrastructure program, which included the construction of large housing projects, sports complexes, theaters, museums, aqueducts, roads, highways, and the massive Columbus Lighthouse, completed in 1992 during a later tenure. During Balaguer's administration, the Dominican military forced Haitians to cut sugarcane on Dominican sugar plantations.

In September 1977, twelve Cuban-manned MiG-21s conducted strafing flights over Puerto Plata to warn Balaguer against intercepting Cuban merchant ships headed to or returning from Africa. Hurricane David hit the Dominican Republic in August 1979, which left upwards of 2,000 people dead and 200,000 homeless. The hurricane caused over $1 billion in damage.

In 1978, Balaguer was succeeded in the presidency by opposition candidate Antonio Guzmán Fernández, of the Dominican Revolutionary Party (PRD). Another PRD win in 1982 followed, under Salvador Jorge Blanco. Balaguer regained the presidency in 1986 and was re-elected in 1990 and 1994, this last time just defeating PRD candidate José Francisco Peña Gómez, a former mayor of Santo Domingo.

During this period, the international community condemned the Dominican government for their continued exploitation of Haitian sugar cane workers; it had been alleged that thousands of these workers had essentially been put into slavery, forced to do backbreaking work under the supervision of armed guards.

The 1994 elections were flawed, bringing on international pressure, to which Balaguer responded by scheduling another presidential contest in 1996. Balaguer was not a candidate. The PSRC candidate was his Vice President Jacinto Peynado Garrigosa.

1996–present 

In 1996, with the support of Joaquín Balaguer and the Social Christian Reform Party in a coalition called the Patriotic Front, Leonel Fernández achieved the first-ever win for the Dominican Liberation Party (PLD), which Bosch had founded in 1973 after leaving the PRD (which he also had founded). Fernández oversaw a fast-growing economy: growth averaged 7.7% per year, unemployment fell, and there were stable exchange and inflation rates.
His administration supported the process of modernizing the judicial system, making transparent the creation of an independent Supreme Court of Justice. Efforts were also made to reform and modernize the other state bodies. In addition, relations with Cuba were reestablished and the Free Trade Agreement with Central America was signed, which was the genesis for the signing of DR-CAFTA.

In 2000, the PRD's Hipólito Mejía won the election. This was a time of economic troubles. Nevertheless, his government was marked by major economic and social reforms, apart from a decentralization of the national budget. Among the laws created in this period are the Social Security, the Monetary and Financial Code, the Stock Market, Electricity, Electronic Commerce, the Police Law, the Environment, Public Health, the Chamber of Accounts, the Insurance Law, Administrative Independence and Budgetary of the Legislative Power and Judicial Power; in addition, creation of the Santo Domingo Province and its municipalities, a larger budget for municipalities, as well as other laws. This meant in the 2002 elections, obtaining a congressional and municipal majority. During this period, great sports structures were built for the 2003 Pan American Games. Under Mejía, the Dominican Republic participated in the US-led coalition, as part of the Multinational Plus Ultra Brigade, during the 2003 invasion of Iraq, suffering no casualties. In 2004, the country withdrew its approximately 300 soldiers from Iraq. The government of President Mejía had to negotiate the Free Trade Agreement with the United States, the main trading partner. He also promoted various commercial measures, popularly called "Economic Package". This "package" was accompanied by a series of social measures, such as aid to agricultural producers, subsidies to electricity rates, construction of streets, sidewalks, local roads, etc., as well as subsidies to poor families whose children attended schools, as well as the creation of new taxes and increases in existing ones.

In 2003, the bankruptcy of three banking entities whose savers were protected by the government led to inflation. This caused a severe economic crisis accompanied by the devaluation of the currency and capital outflows, instability that led to the bankruptcy of many companies. With the congressional majority obtained in 2002, President Mejía promoted a constitutional reform that restored the possibility of presidential reelection, which had been abolished in 1994 at the request of his own party. This reform caused problems within his party causing a division within its main leaders.
Mejía was defeated in his re-election effort in 2004 by Leonel Fernández of the PLD who won with 57.11% of the votes the presidential elections. At the beginning of his second presidential term, he made an effort to combat the economic crisis, reestablishing macroeconomic stability, through the reduction of the dollar exchange rate and the return of confidence in the economy among other measures. However, his administrations was accused of corruption. President Fernández's management consisted of improving Santo Domingo's collective transport system, the first Metro line was built; the completion of the main communication routes to the country's tourist poles; the construction of new schools or the construction of more classrooms, as well as the provision of computer centers with modern computers and Internet to the communities in coordination with schools, churches or clubs. It continued its program of modernization of the state, strengthening the formulation and execution of the budget and promoting laws to make the public acquisition of goods and services transparent.

In 2008, Fernández was elected for a third term. Fernández and the PLD are credited with initiatives that have moved the country forward technologically, on the other hand, his administrations have been accused of corruption.

Danilo Medina of the PLD was elected president in 2012 and re-elected in 2016. On the other hand, a significant increase in crime, government corruption and a weak justice system threaten to overshadow their administrative period.

He was succeeded by the opposition candidate Luis Abinader in the 2020 election (weeks after protests erupted in the country against Medina's government), marking the end to 16 years in power of the centre-left Dominican Liberation Party (PLD).

Geography 

The Dominican Republic comprises the eastern five-eighths of Hispaniola, the second-largest island in the Greater Antilles, with the Atlantic Ocean to the north and the Caribbean Sea to the south. It shares the island roughly at a 2:1 ratio with Haiti, the north-to-south (though somewhat irregular) border between the two countries being . To the north and north-west lie The Bahamas and the Turks and Caicos Islands, and to the east, across the Mona Passage, the US Commonwealth of Puerto Rico. The Dominican Republic's capital and largest city Santo Domingo is on the southern coast.

The Dominican Republic has four important mountain ranges. The most northerly is the Cordillera Septentrional ("Northern Mountain Range"), which extends from the northwestern coastal town of Monte Cristi, near the Haitian border, to the Samaná Peninsula in the east, running parallel to the Atlantic coast. The highest range in the Dominican Republic – indeed, in the whole of the West Indies – is the Cordillera Central ("Central Mountain Range"). It gradually bends southwards and finishes near the town of Azua, on the Caribbean coast. In the Cordillera Central are the four highest peaks in the Caribbean: Pico Duarte ( above sea level), La Pelona, La Rucilla, and Pico Yaque. In the southwest corner of the country, south of the Cordillera Central, there are two other ranges: the more northerly of the two is the Sierra de Neiba, while in the south the Sierra de Bahoruco is a continuation of the Massif de la Selle in Haiti. There are other, minor mountain ranges, such as the Cordillera Oriental ("Eastern Mountain Range"), Sierra Martín García, Sierra de Yamasá, and Sierra de Samaná.

Between the Central and Northern mountain ranges lies the rich and fertile Cibao valley. This major valley is home to the cities of Santiago and La Vega and most of the farming areas of the nation. Rather less productive are the semi-arid San Juan Valley, south of the Central Cordillera, and the Neiba Valley, tucked between the Sierra de Neiba and the Sierra de Bahoruco. Much of the land around the Enriquillo Basin is below sea level, with a hot, arid, desert-like environment. There are other smaller valleys in the mountains, such as the Constanza, Jarabacoa, Villa Altagracia, and Bonao valleys.

The Llano Costero del Caribe ("Caribbean Coastal Plain") is the largest of the plains in the Dominican Republic. Stretching north and east of Santo Domingo, it contains many sugar plantations in the savannahs that are common there. Another large plain is the Plena de Azua ("Azua Plain"), a very arid region in Azua Province. A few other small coastal plains are on the northern coast and in the Pedernales Peninsula.

Four major rivers drain the numerous mountains of the Dominican Republic. The Yaque del Norte is the longest and most important Dominican river. It carries excess water down from the Cibao Valley and empties into Monte Cristi Bay, in the northwest. Likewise, the Yuna River serves the Vega Real and empties into Samaná Bay, in the northeast. Drainage of the San Juan Valley is provided by the San Juan River, tributary of the Yaque del Sur, which empties into the Caribbean, in the south. The Artibonito is the longest river of Hispaniola and flows westward into Haiti.

There are many lakes and coastal lagoons. Other important lakes are Laguna de Rincón or Cabral, with fresh water, and Laguna de Oviedo, a lagoon with brackish water.

There are many small offshore islands and cays that form part of the Dominican territory. The two largest islands near shore are Saona, in the southeast, and Beata, in the southwest. Smaller islands include the Cayos Siete Hermanos, Isla Cabra, Cayo Jackson, Cayo Limón, Cayo Levantado, Cayo la Bocaina, Catalanita, Cayo Pisaje and Isla Alto Velo. Navidad Bank and Silver Bank have been officially claimed by the Dominican Republic. Isla Cabritos lies within Lago Enriquillo.

The Dominican Republic is located near fault action in the Caribbean. In 1946, it suffered a magnitude 8.1 earthquake off the northeast coast, triggering a tsunami that killed about 1,800, mostly in coastal communities. Caribbean countries and the United States have collaborated to create tsunami warning systems and are mapping high-risk low-lying areas.

The country is home to five terrestrial ecoregions: Hispaniolan moist forests, Hispaniolan dry forests, Hispaniolan pine forests, Enriquillo wetlands, and Greater Antilles mangroves. It had a 2018 Forest Landscape Integrity Index mean score of 4.18/10, ranking it 134th globally out of 172 countries.

Climate 

The Dominican Republic has a tropical rainforest climate in the coastal and lowland areas. Some areas, such as most of the Cibao region, have a tropical savanna climate. Due to its diverse topography, Dominican Republic's climate shows considerable variation over short distances and is the most varied of all the Antilles. January and February are the coolest months of the year while August is the hottest month. Snowfall can be seen on rare occasions on the summit of Pico Duarte.

The wet season along the northern coast lasts from November through January. Elsewhere the wet season stretches from May through November, with May being the wettest month. Average annual rainfall is  countrywide, with individual locations in the Valle de Neiba seeing averages as low as  while the Cordillera Oriental averages . The driest part of the country lies in the west.

Tropical cyclones strike the Dominican Republic every couple of years, with 65% of the impacts along the southern coast. Hurricanes are most likely between June and October. The last major hurricane that struck the country was Hurricane Georges in 1998.

Government and politics 

The Dominican Republic is a representative democracy or democratic republic, with three branches of power: executive, legislative, and judicial. The president of the Dominican Republic heads the executive branch and executes laws passed by the congress, appoints the cabinet, and is commander in chief of the armed forces. The president and vice-president run for office on the same ticket and are elected by direct vote for four-year terms. The national legislature is bicameral, composed of a senate, which has 32 members, and the Chamber of Deputies, with 178 members.

Judicial authority rests with the Supreme Court of Justice's 16 members.  The court "alone hears actions against the president, designated members of his Cabinet, and members of Congress when the legislature is in session." The court is appointed by a council known as the National Council of the Magistracy which is composed of the president, the leaders of both houses of Congress, the President of the Supreme Court, and an opposition or non–governing-party member.

The Dominican Republic has a multi-party political system. Elections are held every two years, alternating between the presidential elections, which are held in years evenly divisible by four, and the congressional and municipal elections, which are held in even-numbered years not divisible by four. "International observers have found that presidential and congressional elections since 1996 have been generally free and fair." The Central Elections Board (JCE) of nine members supervises elections, and its decisions are unappealable. Starting from 2016, elections will be held jointly, after a constitutional reform.

Political culture 

The three major parties are the conservative Social Christian Reformist Party, in power 1966–78 and 1986–96; and the social democratic Dominican Revolutionary Party, in power in 1963, 1978–86, and 2000–04; and the Dominican Liberation Party, in power 1996–2000 and since 2004.

The presidential elections of 2008 were held on May 16, 2008, with incumbent Leonel Fernández winning 53% of the vote. He defeated Miguel Vargas Maldonado, of the PRD, who achieved a 40.48% share of the vote. Amable Aristy, of the PRSC, achieved 4.59% of the vote. Other minority candidates, which included former Attorney General Guillermo Moreno from the Movement for Independence, Unity and Change, and PRSC former presidential candidate and defector Eduardo Estrella, obtained less than 1% of the vote.

In the 2012 presidential elections, the incumbent president Leonel Fernández (PLD) declined his aspirations and instead the PLD elected Danilo Medina as its candidate. This time the PRD presented ex-president Hipólito Mejía as its choice. The contest was won by Medina with 51.21% of the vote, against 46.95% in favor of Mejía. Candidate Guillermo Moreno obtained 1.37% of the votes.

In 2014, the Modern Revolutionary Party was created by a faction of leaders from the PRD, and has since become the predominant opposition party, polling in second place for the May 2016 general elections.

In 2020, protests erupted against the PLD's rule. The presidential candidate for the opposition Modern Revolutionary Party (PRM), Luis Abinader,  won the election, defeating the Dominican Liberation Party (PLD), which had governed since 2004.

Foreign relations 

The Dominican Republic has a close relationship with the United States, and has close cultural ties with the Commonwealth of Puerto Rico, and other states and jurisdictions of the United States.

The Dominican Republic's relationship with neighbouring Haiti is strained over mass Haitian migration to the Dominican Republic, with citizens of the Dominican Republic blaming the Haitians for increased crime and other social problems. The Dominican Republic is a regular member of the Organisation Internationale de la Francophonie.

The Dominican Republic has a Free Trade Agreement with the United States, Costa Rica, El Salvador, Guatemala, Honduras and Nicaragua via the Dominican Republic-Central America Free Trade Agreement. And an Economic Partnership Agreement with the European Union and the Caribbean Community via the Caribbean Forum.

Military 

The Armed Forces of the Dominican Republic are the military forces of the Dominican Republic. They consists of approximately 56,000 active duty personnel. The President of the Dominican Republic is the commander in chief of the Armed Forces of the Dominican Republic and the Ministry of Defense is the chief managing body of the armed forces.

The Army, with 28,750 active duty personnel, consists of six infantry brigades, an air cavalry squadron and a combat service support brigade. The Air Force operates two main bases, one in southern region near Santo Domingo and one in the northern region of the country, the air force operates approximately 75 aircraft including helicopters. The Navy operates two major naval bases, one in Santo Domingo and one in Las Calderas on the southwestern coast.

The armed forces have organized a Specialized Airport Security Corps (CESA) and a Specialized Port Security Corps (CESEP) to meet international security needs in these areas. The secretary of the armed forces has also announced plans to form a specialized border corps (CESEF). The armed forces provide 75% of personnel to the National Investigations Directorate (DNI) and the Counter-Drug Directorate (DNCD).

In 2018, Dominican Republic signed the UN treaty on the Prohibition of Nuclear Weapons.

Administrative divisions 

The Dominican Republic is divided into 31 provinces. Santo Domingo, the capital, is designated Distrito Nacional (National District). The provinces are divided into municipalities (municipios; singular municipio). They are the second-level political and administrative subdivisions of the country. The president appoints the governors of the 31 provinces. Mayors and municipal councils administer the 124 municipal districts and the National District (Santo Domingo). They are elected at the same time as congressional representatives.

The provinces are the first–level administrative subdivisions of the country. The headquarters of the central government's regional offices are normally found in the capital cities of provinces. The president appoints an administrative governor (Gobernador Civil) for each province but not for the Distrito Nacional (Title IX of the constitution).

The Distrito Nacional was created in 1936. Prior to this, the Distrito National was the old Santo Domingo Province, in existence since the country's independence in 1844. It is not to be confused with the new Santo Domingo Province split off from it in 2001. While it is similar to a province in many ways, the Distrito Nacional differs in its lack of an administrative governor and consisting only of one municipality, Santo Domingo, the city council (ayuntamiento) and mayor (síndico) which are in charge of its administration.

Economy 

During the last three decades, the Dominican economy, formerly dependent on the export of agricultural commodities (mainly sugar, cocoa and coffee), has transitioned to a diversified mix of services, manufacturing, agriculture, mining, and trade. The service sector accounts for almost 60% of GDP; manufacturing, for 22%; tourism, telecommunications and finance are the main components of the service sector; however, none of them accounts for more than 10% of the whole. The Dominican Republic has a stock market, Bolsa de Valores de la República Dominicana (BVRD). and advanced telecommunication system and transportation infrastructure. High unemployment and income inequality are long-term challenges. International migration affects the Dominican Republic greatly, as it receives and sends large flows of migrants. Mass illegal Haitian immigration and the integration of Dominicans of Haitian descent are major issues. A large Dominican diaspora exists, mostly in the United States, contributes to development, sending billions of dollars to Dominican families in remittances.

Remittances in Dominican Republic increased to US$4571.30 million in 2014 from US$3333 million in 2013 (according to data reported by the Inter-American Development Bank). Economic growth takes place in spite of a chronic energy shortage, which causes frequent blackouts and very high prices. Despite a widening merchandise trade deficit, tourism earnings and remittances have helped build foreign exchange reserves. Following economic turmoil in the late 1980s and 1990, during which the gross domestic product (GDP) fell by up to 5% and consumer price inflation reached an unprecedented 100%, the Dominican Republic entered a period of growth and declining inflation until 2002, after which the economy entered a recession.

This recession followed the collapse of the second-largest commercial bank in the country, Baninter, linked to a major incident of fraud valued at US$3.5 billion. The Baninter fraud had a devastating effect on the Dominican economy, with GDP dropping by 1% in 2003 as inflation ballooned by over 27%. All defendants, including the star of the trial, Ramón Báez Figueroa (the great-grandson of President Buenaventura Báez), were convicted.

According to the 2005 Annual Report of the United Nations Subcommittee on Human Development in the Dominican Republic, the country is ranked No. 71 in the world for resource availability, No. 79 for human development, and No. 14 in the world for resource mismanagement. These statistics emphasize national government corruption, foreign economic interference in the country, and the rift between the rich and poor.

The Dominican Republic has a noted problem of child labor in its coffee, rice, sugarcane, and tomato industries. The labor injustices in the sugarcane industry extend to forced labor according to the U.S. Department of Labor. Three large groups own 75% of the land: the State Sugar Council (Consejo Estatal del Azúcar, CEA), Grupo Vicini, and Central Romana Corporation.

According to the 2016 Global Slavery Index, an estimated 104,800 people are enslaved in the modern day Dominican Republic, or 1.00% of the population. Some slaves in the Dominican Republic are held on sugar plantations, guarded by men on horseback with rifles, and forced to work.

Currency 

The Dominican peso (abbreviated $ or RD$; ISO 4217 code is "DOP") is the national currency, with the United States dollar, the Euro, the Canadian dollar and the Swiss franc also accepted at most tourist sites. The exchange rate to the U.S. dollar, liberalized by 1985, stood at 2.70 pesos per dollar in August 1986, 14.00 pesos in 1993, and 16.00 pesos in 2000.  the rate was 50.08 pesos per dollar.

Tourism 

Tourism is one of the fueling factors in the Dominican Republic's economic growth. The Dominican Republic is the most popular tourist destination in the Caribbean. With the construction of projects like Cap Cana, San Souci Port in Santo Domingo, Casa De Campo and the Hard Rock Hotel & Casino (ancient Moon Palace Resort) in Punta Cana, the Dominican Republic expects increased tourism activity in the upcoming years.

Ecotourism has also been a topic increasingly important in this nation, with towns like Jarabacoa and neighboring Constanza, and locations like the Pico Duarte, Bahia de las Aguilas, and others becoming more significant in efforts to increase direct benefits from tourism. Most residents from other countries are required to get a tourist card, depending on the country they live in. In the last 10 years the Dominican Republic has become one of the world's notably progressive states in terms of recycling and waste disposal. A UN report cited there was a 221.3% efficiency increase in the previous 10 years due, in part, to the opening of the largest open air landfill site located in the north 10 km from the Haitian border.

Infrastructure

Transportation 

The country has three national trunk highways, which connect every major town. These are DR-1, DR-2, and DR-3, which depart from Santo Domingo toward the northern (Cibao), southwestern (Sur), and eastern (El Este) parts of the country respectively. These highways have been consistently improved with the expansion and reconstruction of many sections. Two other national highways serve as spur (DR-5) or alternative routes (DR-4).

In addition to the national highways, the government has embarked on an expansive reconstruction of spur secondary routes, which connect smaller towns to the trunk routes. In the last few years the government constructed a 106-kilometer toll road that connects Santo Domingo with the country's northeastern peninsula. Travelers may now arrive in the Samaná Peninsula in less than two hours. Other additions are the reconstruction of the DR-28 (Jarabacoa – Constanza) and DR-12 (Constanza – Bonao). Despite these efforts, many secondary routes still remain either unpaved or in need of maintenance. There is currently a nationwide program to pave these and other commonly used routes. Also, the Santiago light rail system is in planning stages but currently on hold.

Bus services 
There are two main bus transportation services in the Dominican Republic: one controlled by the government, through the Oficina Técnica de Transito Terrestre (OTTT) and the Oficina Metropolitana de Servicios de Autobuses (OMSA), and the other controlled by private business, among them, Federación Nacional de Transporte La Nueva Opción (FENATRANO) and the Confederacion Nacional de Transporte (CONATRA). The government transportation system covers large routes in metropolitan areas such as Santo Domingo and Santiago.

There are many privately owned bus companies, such as Metro Servicios Turísticos and Caribe Tours, that run daily routes.

Santo Domingo Metro 

The Dominican Republic has a rapid transit system in Santo Domingo, the country's capital. It is the most extensive metro system in the insular Caribbean and Central American region by length and number of stations. The Santo Domingo Metro is part of a major "National Master Plan" to improve transportation in Santo Domingo as well as the rest of the nation. The first line was planned to relieve traffic congestion in the Máximo Gómez and Hermanas Mirabal Avenue. The second line, which opened in April 2013, is meant to relieve the congestion along the Duarte-Kennedy-Centenario Corridor in the city from west to east. Before the opening of the second line, 30,856,515 passengers rode the Santo Domingo Metro in 2012. With both lines opened, ridership increased to 61,270,054 passengers in 2014.

Communications 

The Dominican Republic has a well developed telecommunications infrastructure, with extensive mobile phone and landline services. Cable Internet and DSL are available in most parts of the country, and many Internet service providers offer 3G wireless internet service. The Dominican Republic became the second country in Latin America to have 4G LTE wireless service. The reported speeds are from 1 Mbit/s up to 100 Mbit/s for residential services.

For commercial service there are speeds from 256 kbit/s up to 154 Mbit/s. (Each set of numbers denotes downstream/upstream speed; that is, to the user/from the user.) Projects to extend Wi-Fi hot spots have been made in Santo Domingo. The country's commercial radio stations and television stations are in the process of transferring to the digital spectrum, via HD Radio and HDTV after officially adopting ATSC as the digital medium in the country with a switch-off of analog transmission by September 2015. The telecommunications regulator in the country is INDOTEL (Instituto Dominicano de Telecomunicaciones).

The largest telecommunications company is Claro – part of Carlos Slim's América Móvil – which provides wireless, landline, broadband, and IPTV services. In June 2009 there were more than 8 million phone line subscribers (land and cell users) in the D.R., representing 81% of the country's population and a fivefold increase since the year 2000, when there were 1.6 million. The communications sector generates about 3.0% of the GDP. There were 2,439,997 Internet users in March 2009.

In November 2009, the Dominican Republic became the first Latin American country to pledge to include a "gender perspective" in every information and communications technology (ICT) initiative and policy developed by the government. This is part of the regional eLAC2010 plan. The tool the Dominicans have chosen to design and evaluate all the public policies is the APC Gender Evaluation Methodology (GEM).

Electricity 

Electric power service has been unreliable since the Trujillo era, and as much as 75% of the equipment is that old. The country's antiquated power grid causes transmission losses that account for a large share of billed electricity from generators. The privatization of the sector started under a previous administration of Leonel Fernández. The recent investment in a 345 kilovolt "Santo Domingo–Santiago Electrical Highway" with reduced transmission losses, is being heralded as a major capital improvement to the national grid since the mid-1960s.

During the Trujillo regime electrical service was introduced to many cities. Almost 95% of usage was not billed at all. Around half of the Dominican Republic's 2.1 million houses have no meters and most do not pay or pay a fixed monthly rate for their electric service.

Household and general electrical service is delivered at 110 volts alternating at 60 Hz. Electrically powered items from the United States work with no modifications. The majority of the Dominican Republic has access to electricity. Tourist areas tend to have more reliable power, as do business, travel, healthcare, and vital infrastructure. Concentrated efforts were announced to increase efficiency of delivery to places where the collection rate reached 70%. The electricity sector is highly politicized. Some generating companies are undercapitalized and at times unable to purchase adequate fuel supplies.

Society

Demographics 

In 2010, 31.2% of the population was under 15 years of age, with 6% of the population over 65 years of age. There were an estimated 102.3 males for every 100 females in 2020. The annual population growth rate for 2006–2007 was 1.5%, with the projected population for the year 2015 being 10,121,000.

The population density in 2007 was 192 per km2 (498 per sq mi), and 63% of the population lived in urban areas. The southern coastal plains and the Cibao Valley are the most densely populated areas of the country. The capital city Santo Domingo had a population of 2,907,100 in 2010.

Other important cities are Santiago de los Caballeros ( 745,293), La Romana (pop. 214,109), San Pedro de Macorís (pop. 185,255), Higüey (153,174), San Francisco de Macorís (pop. 132,725), Puerto Plata (pop. 118,282), and La Vega (pop. 104,536). Per the United Nations, the urban population growth rate for 2000–2005 was 2.3%.

Ethnic groups 

In a 2014 population survey, 70.4% self-identified as mixed (mestizo/indio 58%, mulatto 12.4%), 15.8% as black, 13.5% as white, and 0.3% as "other". Ethnic immigrant groups in the country include West Asians—mostly Lebanese, Syrians, and Palestinians; the current president, Luis Abinader, is of Lebanese descent. East Asians, Koreans, ethnic Chinese and Japanese, can also be found. Europeans are represented mostly by Spanish whites but also with smaller populations of Germans, Italians, French, British, Dutch, Swiss, Russians, and Hungarians.

Languages 

The population of the Dominican Republic is mostly Spanish-speaking. The local variant of Spanish is called Dominican Spanish, which closely resembles other Spanish vernaculars in the Caribbean and has similarities to Canarian Spanish. In addition, it has influences from African languages and borrowed words from indigenous Caribbean languages particular to the island of Hispaniola. Schools are based on a Spanish educational model; English and French are mandatory foreign languages in both private and public schools, although the quality of foreign languages teaching is poor. Some private educational institutes provide teaching in other languages, notably Italian, Japanese and Mandarin.

Haitian Creole is the largest minority language in the Dominican Republic and is spoken by Haitian immigrants and their descendants. There is a community of a few thousand people whose ancestors spoke Samaná English in the Samaná Peninsula. They are the descendants of formerly enslaved African Americans who arrived in the nineteenth century, but only a few elders speak the language today. Tourism, American pop culture, the influence of Dominican Americans, and the country's economic ties with the United States motivate other Dominicans to learn English. The Dominican Republic is ranked 2nd in Latin America and 23rd in the World on English proficiency.

Population centres

Religion 

95.0%  Christians 
2.6%  No religion 
2.2%  Other religions 

, 57% of the population (5.7 million) identified themselves as Roman Catholics and 23% (2.3 million) as Protestants (in Latin American countries, Protestants are often called Evangelicos because they emphasize personal and public evangelising and many are Evangelical Protestant or of a Pentecostal group). From 1896 to 1907 missionaries from the Episcopal, Free Methodist, Seventh-day Adventist and Moravians churches began work in the Dominican Republic. Three percent of the 10.63 million Dominican Republic population are Seventh-day Adventists. Recent immigration as well as proselytizing efforts have brought in other religious groups, with the following shares of the population: Spiritist: 2.2%, The Church of Jesus Christ of Latter-day Saints: 1.3%, Buddhist: 0.1%, Baháʼí: 0.1%, Chinese Folk Religion: 0.1%, Islam: 0.02%, Judaism: 0.01%.

The Catholic Church began to lose its strong dominance in the late 19th century. This was due to a lack of funding, priests, and support programs. During the same time, Protestant Evangelicalism began to gain a wider support "with their emphasis on personal responsibility and family rejuvenation, economic entrepreneurship, and biblical fundamentalism". The Dominican Republic has two Catholic patroness saints: Nuestra Señora de la Altagracia (Our Lady Of High Grace) and Nuestra Señora de las Mercedes (Our Lady Of Mercy).

The Dominican Republic has historically granted extensive religious freedom. According to the United States Department of State, "The constitution specifies that there is no state church and provides for freedom of religion and belief. A concordat with the Vatican designates Catholicism as the official religion and extends special privileges to the Catholic Church not granted to other religious groups. These include the legal recognition of church law, use of public funds to underwrite some church expenses, and complete exoneration from customs duties." In the 1950s restrictions were placed upon churches by the government of Trujillo. Letters of protest were sent against the mass arrests of government adversaries. Trujillo began a campaign against the Catholic Church and planned to arrest priests and bishops who preached against the government. This campaign ended before it was put into place, with his assassination.

During World War II a group of Jews escaping Nazi Germany fled to the Dominican Republic and founded the city of Sosúa. It has remained the center of the Jewish population since.

20th century immigration 

In the 20th century, many Arabs (from Lebanon, Syria, and Palestine), Japanese, and, to a lesser degree, Koreans settled in the country as agricultural laborers and merchants. The Chinese companies found business in telecom, mining, and railroads. The Arab community is rising at an increasing rate and is estimated at 80,000.

In addition, there are descendants of immigrants who came from other Caribbean islands, including St. Kitts and Nevis, Antigua, St. Vincent, Montserrat, Tortola, St. Croix, St. Thomas, and Guadeloupe. They worked on sugarcane plantations and docks and settled mainly in the cities of San Pedro de Macorís and Puerto Plata. Puerto Rican, and to a lesser extent, Cuban immigrants fled to the Dominican Republic from the mid-1800s until about 1940 due to a poor economy and social unrest in their respective home countries. Many Puerto Rican immigrants settled in Higüey, among other cities, and quickly assimilated due to similar culture. Before and during World War II, 800 Jewish refugees moved to the Dominican Republic.

Numerous immigrants have come from other Caribbean countries, as the country has offered economic opportunities. There is an increasing number of Puerto Rican immigrants, especially in and around Santo Domingo; they are believed to number around 10,000. There are many Haitians and Venezuelans living in the Dominican Republic illegally.

Haitian immigration 

Human Rights Watch estimated that 70,000 documented Haitian immigrants and 1,930,000 undocumented immigrants were living in Dominican Republic.

Haiti is the neighboring nation to the Dominican Republic and is considerably poorer, less developed and is additionally the least developed country in the western hemisphere. In 2003, 80% of all Haitians were poor (54% living in abject poverty) and 47.1% were illiterate. The country of nine million people also has a fast growing population, but over two-thirds of the labor force lack formal jobs. Haiti's per capita GDP (PPP) was $1,800 in 2017, or just over one-tenth of the Dominican figure.

As a result, hundreds of thousands of Haitians have migrated to the Dominican Republic, with some estimates of 800,000 Haitians in the country, while others put the Haitian-born population as high as one million. They usually work at low-paying and unskilled jobs in building construction and house cleaning and in sugar plantations. There have been accusations that some Haitian immigrants work in slavery-like conditions and are severely exploited.

Due to the lack of basic amenities and medical facilities in Haiti a large number of Haitian women, often arriving with several health problems, cross the border to Dominican soil. They deliberately come during their last weeks of pregnancy to obtain medical attention for childbirth, since Dominican public hospitals do not refuse medical services based on nationality or legal status. Statistics from a hospital in Santo Domingo report that over 22% of childbirths are by Haitian mothers.

Haiti also suffers from severe environmental degradation. Deforestation is rampant in Haiti; today less than 4 percent of Haiti's forests remain, and in many places the soil has eroded right down to the bedrock. Haitians burn wood charcoal for 60% of their domestic energy production. Because of Haiti running out of plant material to burn, some Haitian bootleggers have created an illegal market for charcoal on the Dominican side. Conservative estimates calculate the illegal movement of 115 tons of charcoal per week from the Dominican Republic to Haiti. Dominican officials estimate that at least 10 trucks per week are crossing the border loaded with charcoal.

In 2005, Dominican President Leonel Fernández criticized collective expulsions of Haitians as having taken place "in an abusive and inhuman way". After a UN delegation issued a preliminary report stating that it found a profound problem of racism and discrimination against people of Haitian origin, Dominican Foreign Minister Carlos Morales Troncoso issued a formal statement denouncing it, asserting that "our border with Haiti has its problems[;] this is our reality and it must be understood. It is important not to confuse national sovereignty with indifference, and not to confuse security with xenophobia."

Haitian nationals send half a billion dollars total yearly in remittance from the Dominican Republic to Haiti, according to the World Bank.

The government of the Dominican Republic invested a total of $16 billion pesos in health services offered to foreign patients in 2013–2016, according to official data, which includes medical expenses in blood transfusion, clinical analysis, surgeries and other care.  According to official reports, the country spends more than five billion Dominican pesos annually in care for pregnant women who cross the border ready to deliver.

The children of Haitian immigrants are eligible for Haitian nationality, but they may be denied it by Haiti because of a lack of proper documents or witnesses.

Emigration 

The first of three late-20th century emigration waves began in 1961 after the assassination of dictator Trujillo, due to fear of retaliation by Trujillo's allies and political uncertainty in general. In 1965, the United States began a military occupation of the Dominican Republic to end a civil war. Upon this, the U.S. eased travel restrictions, making it easier for Dominicans to obtain U.S. visas. From 1966 to 1978, the exodus continued, fueled by high unemployment and political repression. Communities established by the first wave of immigrants to the U.S. created a network that assisted subsequent arrivals.

In the early 1980s, underemployment, inflation, and the rise in value of the dollar all contributed to a third wave of emigration from the Dominican Republic. Today, emigration from the Dominican Republic remains high. In 2012, there were approximately 1.7 million people of Dominican descent in the U.S., counting both native- and foreign-born. There was also a growing Dominican immigration to Puerto Rico, with nearly 70,000 Dominicans living there . Although that number is slowly decreasing and immigration trends have reversed because of Puerto Rico's economic crisis .

There is a significant Dominican population in Spain.

Health 

In 2020, the Dominican Republic had an estimated birth rate of 18.5 per 1000 and a death rate of 6.3 per 1000.

Education 

Primary education is regulated by the Ministry of Education, with education being a right of all citizens and youth in the Dominican Republic.

Preschool education is organized in different cycles and serves the 2–4 age group and the 4–6 age group. Preschool education is not mandatory except for the last year. Basic education is compulsory and serves the population of the 6–14 age group. Secondary education is not compulsory, although it is the duty of the state to offer it for free. It caters to the 14–18 age group and is organized in a common core of four years and three modes of two years of study that are offered in three different options: general or academic, vocational (industrial, agricultural, and services), and artistic.

The higher education system consists of institutes and universities. The institutes offer courses of a higher technical level. The universities offer technical careers, undergraduate and graduate; these are regulated by the Ministry of Higher Education, Science and Technology. The Dominican Republic was ranked 93rd in the Global Innovation Index in 2021, down from 87th in 2019.

Crime 

In 2012, the Dominican Republic had a murder rate of 22.1 per 100,000 population. There was a total of 2,268 murders in the Dominican Republic in 2012.

The Dominican Republic has become a trans-shipment point for Colombian drugs destined for Europe as well as the United States and Canada. Money-laundering via the Dominican Republic is favored by Colombian drug cartels for the ease of illicit financial transactions. In 2004, it was estimated that 8% of all cocaine smuggled into the United States had come through the Dominican Republic. The Dominican Republic responded with increased efforts to seize drug shipments, arrest and extradite those involved, and combat money-laundering.

The often light treatment of violent criminals has been a continuous source of local controversy. In April 2010, five teenagers, aged 15 to 17, shot and killed two taxi drivers and killed another five by forcing them to drink drain-cleaning acid. On September 24, 2010, the teens were sentenced to prison terms of three to five years, despite the protests of the taxi drivers' families.

Culture 

Due to cultural syncretism, the culture and customs of the Dominican people have a European cultural basis, influenced by both African and native Taíno elements, although endogenous elements have emerged within Dominican culture; culturally the Dominican Republic is among the most-European countries in Spanish America, alongside Puerto Rico, Cuba, Central Chile, Argentina, and Uruguay. Spanish institutions in the colonial era were able to predominate in the Dominican culture's making-of as a relative success in the acculturation and cultural assimilation of African slaves slightly diminished African cultural influence in comparison to other Caribbean countries.

Visual arts 
Dominican art is perhaps most commonly associated with the bright, vibrant colors and images that are sold in every tourist gift shop across the country. However, the country has a long history of fine art that goes back to the middle of the 1800s when the country became independent and the beginnings of a national art scene emerged.

Historically, the painting of this time were centered around images connected to national independence, historical scenes, portraits but also landscapes and images of still life. Styles of painting ranged between neoclassicism and romanticism. Between 1920 and 1940 the art scene was influenced by styles of realism and impressionism. Dominican artists were focused on breaking from previous, academic styles in order to develop more independent and individual styles.

Literature 

The 20th century brought many prominent Dominican writers, and saw a general increase in the perception of Dominican literature.  Writers such as Juan Bosch (one of the greatest storytellers in Latin America), Pedro Mir (national poet of the Dominican Republic), Aida Cartagena Portalatin (poetess par excellence who spoke in the Era of Rafael Trujillo), Emilio Rodríguez Demorizi (the most important Dominican historian, with more than 1000 written works), Manuel del Cabral (main Dominican poet featured in black poetry), Hector Inchustegui Cabral (considered one of the most prominent voices of the Caribbean social poetry of the twentieth century), Miguel Alfonseca (poet belonging to Generation 60), Rene del Risco (acclaimed poet who was a participant in the June 14 Movement), Mateo Morrison (excellent poet and writer with numerous awards), among many more prolific authors, put the island in one of the most important in Literature in the twentieth century.

New 21st century Dominican writers have not yet achieved the renown of their 20th century counterparts. However, writers such as Frank Báez (won the 2006 Santo Domingo Book Fair First Prize)  and Junot Díaz (2008 Pulitzer Prize for Fiction for his novel The Brief Wondrous Life of Oscar Wao) lead Dominican literature in the 21st century.

Architecture 

The architecture in the Dominican Republic represents a complex blend of diverse cultures. The deep influence of the European colonists is the most evident throughout the country. Characterized by ornate designs and baroque structures, the style can best be seen in the capital city of Santo Domingo, which is home to the first cathedral, castle, monastery, and fortress in all of the Americas, located in the city's Colonial Zone, an area declared as a World Heritage Site by UNESCO. The designs carry over into the villas and buildings throughout the country. It can also be observed on buildings that contain stucco exteriors, arched doors and windows, and red tiled roofs.

The indigenous peoples of the Dominican Republic have also had a significant influence on the architecture of the country. The Taíno people relied heavily on the mahogany and guano (dried palm tree leaf) to put together crafts, artwork, furniture, and houses. Utilizing mud, thatched roofs, and mahogany trees, they gave buildings and the furniture inside a natural look, seamlessly blending in with the island's surroundings.

Lately, with the rise in tourism and increasing popularity as a Caribbean vacation destination, architects in the Dominican Republic have now begun to incorporate cutting-edge designs that emphasize luxury. In many ways an architectural playground, villas and hotels implement new styles, while offering new takes on the old. This new style is characterized by simplified, angular corners and large windows that blend outdoor and indoor spaces. As with the culture as a whole, contemporary architects embrace the Dominican Republic's rich history and various cultures to create something new. Surveying modern villas, one can find any combination of the three major styles: a villa may contain angular, modernist building construction, Spanish Colonial-style arched windows, and a traditional Taíno hammock in the bedroom balcony.

Cuisine 

Dominican cuisine is predominantly Spanish, Taíno, and African in origin. The typical cuisine is quite similar to what can be found in other Latin American countries. One breakfast dish consists of eggs and mangú (mashed, boiled plantain). Heartier versions of mangú are accompanied by deep-fried meat (Dominican salami, typically), cheese, or both. Lunch, generally the largest and most important meal of the day, usually consists of rice, meat, beans, and salad. "La Bandera" (literally "The Flag") is the most popular lunch dish; it consists of meat and red beans on white rice. Sancocho is a stew often made with seven varieties of meat.

Meals tend to favor meats and starches over dairy products and vegetables. Many dishes are made with sofrito, which is a mix of local herbs used as a wet rub for meats and sautéed to bring out all of a dish's flavors. Throughout the south-central coast, bulgur, or whole wheat, is a main ingredient in quipes or tipili (bulgur salad). Other favorite Dominican foods include chicharrón, yuca, casabe, pastelitos (empanadas), batata, ñame, pasteles en hoja, chimichurris, and tostones.

Some treats Dominicans enjoy are arroz con leche (or arroz con dulce), bizcocho dominicano (lit. "Dominican cake"), habichuelas con dulce, flan, frío frío (snow cones), dulce de leche, and caña (sugarcane). The beverages Dominicans enjoy are Morir Soñando, rum, beer, Mama Juana, batidas (smoothie), jugos naturales (freshly squeezed fruit juices), mabí, coffee, and chaca (also called maiz caqueao/casqueado, maiz con dulce and maiz con leche), the last item being found only in the southern provinces of the country such as San Juan.

Music and dance 

Musically, the Dominican Republic is known for the world popular musical style and genre called merengue, a type of lively, fast-paced rhythm and dance music consisting of a tempo of about 120 to 160 beats per minute (though it varies) based on musical elements like drums, brass, chorded instruments, and accordion, as well as some elements unique to the Spanish-speaking Caribbean, such as the tambora and güira.

Its syncopated beats use Latin percussion, brass instruments, bass, and piano or keyboard. Between 1937 and 1950 merengue music was promoted internationally by Dominican groups like Billo's Caracas Boys, Chapuseaux and Damiron "Los Reyes del Merengue", Joseito Mateo, and others. Radio, television, and international media popularized it further. Some well known merengue performers are Wilfrido Vargas, Johnny Ventura, singer-songwriter Los Hermanos Rosario, Juan Luis Guerra, Fernando Villalona, Eddy Herrera, Sergio Vargas, Toño Rosario, Milly Quezada, and Chichí Peralta.

Merengue became popular in the United States, mostly on the East Coast, during the 1980s and 1990s, when many Dominican artists residing in the U.S. (particularly New York) started performing in the Latin club scene and gained radio airplay. They included Victor Roque y La Gran Manzana, Henry Hierro, Zacarias Ferreira, Aventura, and Milly Jocelyn Y Los Vecinos. The emergence of bachata, along with an increase in the number of Dominicans living among other Latino groups in New York, New Jersey, and Florida, has contributed to Dominican music's overall growth in popularity.

Bachata, a form of music and dance that originated in the countryside and rural marginal neighborhoods of the Dominican Republic, has become quite popular in recent years. Its subjects are often romantic; especially prevalent are tales of heartbreak and sadness. In fact, the original name for the genre was amargue ("bitterness", or "bitter music"), until the rather ambiguous (and mood-neutral) term bachata became popular. Bachata grew out of, and is still closely related to, the pan-Latin American romantic style called bolero. Over time, it has been influenced by merengue and by a variety of Latin American guitar styles.

Palo is an Afro-Dominican sacred music that can be found throughout the island. The drum and human voice are the principal instruments. Palo is played at religious ceremonies—usually coinciding with saints' religious feast days—as well as for secular parties and special occasions. Its roots are in the Congo region of central-west Africa, but it is mixed with European influences in the melodies.

Salsa music has had a great deal of popularity in the country. During the late 1960s Dominican musicians like Johnny Pacheco, creator of the Fania All Stars, played a significant role in the development and popularization of the genre.

Dominican rock and Reggaeton are also popular. Many, if not the majority, of its performers are based in Santo Domingo and Santiago.

Fashion 

The country boasts one of the ten most important design schools in the region, La Escuela de Diseño de Altos de Chavón, which is making the country a key player in the world of fashion and design. Noted fashion designer Oscar de la Renta was born in the Dominican Republic in 1932, and became a US citizen in 1971. He studied under the leading Spaniard designer Cristóbal Balenciaga and then worked with the house of Lanvin in Paris. By 1963, he had designs bearing his own label. After establishing himself in the US, de la Renta opened boutiques across the country. His work blends French and Spaniard fashion with American styles. Although he settled in New York, de la Renta also marketed his work in Latin America, where it became very popular, and remained active in his native Dominican Republic, where his charitable activities and personal achievements earned him the Juan Pablo Duarte Order of Merit and the Order of Cristóbal Colón. De la Renta died of complications from cancer on October 20, 2014.

National symbols 

Some of the Dominican Republic's important symbols are the flag, the coat of arms, and the national anthem, titled Himno Nacional. The flag has a large white cross that divides it into four quarters. Two quarters are red and two are blue. Red represents the blood shed by the liberators. Blue expresses God's protection over the nation. The white cross symbolizes the struggle of the liberators to bequeath future generations a free nation. An alternative interpretation is that blue represents the ideals of progress and liberty, whereas white symbolizes peace and unity among Dominicans.

In the center of the cross is the Dominican coat of arms, in the same colors as the national flag. The coat of arms pictures a red, white, and blue flag-draped shield with a Bible, a gold cross, and arrows; the shield is surrounded by an olive branch (on the left) and a palm branch (on the right). The Bible traditionally represents the truth and the light. The gold cross symbolizes the redemption from slavery, and the arrows symbolize the noble soldiers and their proud military.  A blue ribbon above the shield reads, "Dios, Patria, Libertad" (meaning "God, Fatherland, Liberty"). A red ribbon under the shield reads, "República Dominicana" (meaning "Dominican Republic"). Out of all the flags in the world, the depiction of a Bible is unique to the Dominican flag.

The national flower is the endemic Bayahibe rose (Leuenbergeria quisqueyana) and the national tree is the West Indian mahogany (Swietenia mahagoni). The national bird is the cigua palmera or palmchat (Dulus dominicus), another endemic species.

The Dominican Republic celebrates Dia de la Altagracia on January 21 in honor of its patroness, Duarte's Day on January 26 in honor of one of its founding fathers, Independence Day on February 27, Restoration Day on August 16, Virgen de las Mercedes on September 24, and Constitution Day on November 6.

Sports 

Baseball is by far the most popular sport in the Dominican Republic. The Dominican Professional Baseball League consists of six teams. Its season usually begins in October and ends in January. After the United States, the Dominican Republic has the second highest number of Major League Baseball (MLB) players. Ozzie Virgil Sr. became the first Dominican-born player in the MLB on September 23, 1956. Juan Marichal, Pedro Martínez, Vladimir Guerrero, and David Ortiz are the only Dominican-born players in the Baseball Hall of Fame. Other notable baseball players born in the Dominican Republic are José Bautista, Adrián Beltré, Juan Soto, Robinson Canó, Rico Carty, Bartolo Colón, Nelson Cruz, Edwin Encarnación, Ubaldo Jiménez, Francisco Liriano, Plácido Polanco, Albert Pujols, Hanley Ramírez, Manny Ramírez, José Reyes, Alfonso Soriano, Sammy Sosa, Fernando Tatís Jr., and Miguel Tejada. Felipe Alou has also enjoyed success as a manager and Omar Minaya as a general manager. In 2013, the Dominican team went undefeated en route to winning the World Baseball Classic.

In boxing, the country has produced scores of world-class fighters and several world champions, such as Carlos Cruz, his brother Leo, Juan Guzman, and Joan Guzman. Basketball also enjoys a relatively high level of popularity. Tito Horford, his son Al, Felipe Lopez, and Francisco Garcia are among the Dominican-born players currently or formerly in the National Basketball Association (NBA). Olympic gold medalist and world champion hurdler Félix Sánchez hails from the Dominican Republic, as does NFL defensive end Luis Castillo.

Other important sports are volleyball, introduced in 1916 by U.S. Marines and controlled by the Dominican Volleyball Federation, taekwondo, in which Gabriel Mercedes won an Olympic silver medal in 2008, and judo.

See also 

 Index of Dominican Republic-related articles
 Outline of the Dominican Republic

Notes

References

Bibliography

Further reading 
 Wiarda, Howard J., and Michael J. Kryzanek. The Dominican Republic: a Caribbean Crucible, in series, Nations of Contemporary Latin America, and also Westview Profiles. Boulder, Colo.: Westview Press, 1982.  pbk.
 Jared Diamond, Collapse: How Societies Choose to Fail or Succeed, Penguin Books, 2005 and 2011. See chapter 11 entitled "One Island, Two People, Two Histories: The Dominican Republic and Haiti".

External links 

  Presidency of the Dominican Republic
 Official country website
 Dominican Republic at UCB Libraries GovPubs
 Dominican Republic profile from the BBC News
 Official Website of the Ministry of Tourism of the Dominican Republic
 Official Commercial Website Ministry of Tourism of the Dominican Republic
 Official Website of the IDDI, Instituto Dominicano de Desarrollo Integral
 Caribbean Connections: Dominican Republic teaching guide for middle and high school students

 
1844 establishments in North America
Christian states
Countries in North America
Countries in the Caribbean
Former French colonies
Former Spanish colonies
Former colonies in North America
New Spain
Greater Antilles
Island countries
Member states of the United Nations
Republics
Small Island Developing States
Spanish Caribbean
Spanish West Indies
1492 establishments in the Spanish West Indies
1821 establishments in the Dominican Republic
1822 establishments in Haiti
1844 disestablishments in Haiti
1861 establishments in the Spanish West Indies
1865 disestablishments in the Spanish West Indies
Spanish-speaking countries and territories
Spanish colonization of the Americas
States and territories established in 1844